ENHS may refer to:
 Edinburg North High School, Edinburg, Texas, United States
 Eisenhower National Historic Site
 Encapsulated Nuclear Heat Source
 East Noble High School, high school in Kendallville, Indiana